Aaron James (born October 5, 1952) is a retired American professional basketball player. He spent his entire five-year National Basketball Association (NBA) career with the New Orleans Jazz.

James, a 6'8" small forward, averaged 10.8 points and 4.1 rebounds over 356 career games from 1974 to 1979 with the Jazz, who drafted him out of Grambling State University with the 10th pick of the second round of the 1974 NBA draft. He was the team's first ever selection.

He was also selected by the Utah Stars in the third round of the 1974 ABA Draft.

Notes

External links
NBA stats @ basketballreference.com

1952 births
Living people
African-American basketball players
African-American college athletic directors in the United States
American expatriate basketball people in Italy
American expatriate basketball people in the Philippines
American men's basketball players
Basketball coaches from Louisiana
Basketball players from New Orleans
Grambling State Tigers athletic directors
Grambling State Tigers men's basketball coaches
Grambling State Tigers men's basketball players
Mens Sana Basket players
New Orleans Jazz draft picks
New Orleans Jazz players
Philippine Basketball Association imports
San Miguel Beermen players
Small forwards
Sportspeople from New Orleans
U/Tex Wranglers players
21st-century African-American people
20th-century African-American sportspeople